The Cimidae is a taxonomic family of sea snails, marine gastropod mollusks in the infraclass Lower Heterobranchia.

Genera 
 Atomiscala de Boury, 1909
 Austrorissopsis Grant-Mackie & Chapman-Smith, 1971
 Bouryiscala Cossmann, 1902
 Cima Chaster, 1898
 Coenaculum Iredale, 1924
 Cristalloella Bandel, 1995 †
 Discobasis Cossmann, 1888 †
 Graphis Jeffreys, 1867
 Itiscala P. A. Maxwell, 1992 †
 Mifsudia Mietto, Nofroni & Quaggiotto, 2014
 Rotfanella Gründel, 1998 †
Genera brought into synonymy
 Cioniscus Jeffreys, 1869: synonym of Graphis Jeffreys, 1867 (unnecessary substitute name for Graphis)
 Dissopalia Iredale, 1936: synonym of Bouryiscala Cossmann, 1902

References 

 Warén A. (1993). New and little known mollusca from Iceland and Scandinavia. Part 2. Sarsia 78: 159-201
 Jensen, R. H. (1997). A Checklist and Bibliography of the Marine Molluscs of Bermuda. Unp. , 547 pp
 Ermanno Quaggiotto (2013) On the systematic position of “Cima” melitensis Mifsud, 1998, with erection of the new genus Mifsudia (Heterobranchia Cimidae). Proceedings of the Seventh Malacological Pontine Meeting, October 5th- 6th, 2013 - San Felice Circeo, Italy

External links 
 http://www.marinespecies.org/aphia.php?p=taxdetails&id=23005